Oh Happy Day: An All-Star Music Celebration is a gospel music compilation album. It won Best Traditional Gospel Album at the 2010 Grammy Awards.

Production and recording
The album was produced by Ken Levitan, Jon Bon Jovi, Bill Hearn, Jack Rovner, Ken Pennell, and Cedric Thompson. Songs were produced by Drew & Shannon, Johnny K, Sanchez Harley, Obie O’Brien, Keith Thomas, Simon Climie, Michael McDonald, Tommy Sims, Barry Beckett, Joss Stone and Buick Audra.

The album was mastered by Ken Love at Mastermix, in Tennessee.

Awards
In 2010, the album was nominated for a Dove Award for Special Event Album of the Year at the 41st GMA Dove Awards.

Won the Grammy Award Best Traditional Gospel Album at the 52nd Annual Grammy Awards.

Track listing
 "I Believe" - Jonny Lang & Fisk Jubilee Singers
 "In the Presence of the Lord" - 3 Doors Down & The Soul Children of Chicago
 "Higher Ground" - Robert Randolph & The Clark Sisters
 "Keep the Faith" - Jon Bon Jovi & Washington DC Youth Choir
 "People Get Ready" - Al Green & Heather Headley
 "Waiting for My Child to Come Home" - Mavis Staples, Patty Griffin & The Tri-City Singers
 "Storm Before the Calm" - Michael McDonald & West Angeles COGIC Mass
 "Redemption Song" - Angélique Kidjo
 "A Change Is Gonna Come" - Aaron Neville & Mt. Zion Mass Choir
 "Oh Happy Day" - Queen Latifah & Jubilation Choir
 "This Little Light of Mine" - Joss Stone & Buick Audra

Credits
 Art Direction: Jan Cook, Tim Frank
 Design: Matte Varnish
 Liner notes written by John Thompson
 Contracts and Clearances: Sharon Reavis

References

External links
imeem playlist Album playlist
Nabbr widget

2009 compilation albums